Eddy Serri (born 23 November 1974 in Faenza) is an Italian former cyclist. he most notably won the 2007 Giro della Romagna as well as rode in the 2001 and 2002 Giro d'Italia.

Major results

1996
 1st Stage 1 Girobio
2000
 1st GP Città di Rio Saliceto e Correggio
2001
 7th Grand Prix Pino Cerami
 9th GP de la Ville de Rennes
2003
 1st Stage 2 Ster Elektrotoer
 2nd Giro della Romagna
 2nd Criterium d'Abruzzo
 3rd Trofeo Città di Castelfidardo
 6th Coppa Bernocchi
 6th GP Nobili Rubinetterie
 6th Trofeo Matteotti
2005
 6th Druivenkoers-Overijse
 8th Grand Prix de Fourmies
 10th Grand Prix Pino Cerami
2006
 3rd Trofeo Città di Castelfidardo
2007
 1st Giro della Romagna
2008
 1st Giro del Mendrisiotto
 9th GP Kranj

References

1974 births
Living people
Italian male cyclists
People from Faenza
Cyclists from Emilia-Romagna
Sportspeople from the Province of Ravenna